is a 1951 Japanese drama film written and directed by Keisuke Kinoshita.

Plot
In Yobuko, Southern Japan, brothers Tarobei and Jinkichi are running a fishing business with two ships of their own. As the catch is too low to cover the expenses, caused by the corrupt ship captains, their business is threatened with bankruptcy when the investors demand their money back. In addition, the fishing association announces to withdraw the boats' license, as the nationwide number of licensed fishing boats is limited.

After firing the corrupt captains, Tarobei and Jinkichi hire Tsuyoshi and his younger brother Wataru to take over the commands on their ships. When a potential investor offers a loan on the condition that Tarobei gives his younger daughter Miwa as a bride to the investor's son, Tarobei gets into a conflict over his vow never to marry any of his daughters off for monetary reasons. Meanwhile, Miwa has fallen in love with Wataru, while Tsuyoshi has developed an affection for Mie, Miwa's older sister, who lost her husband in the war. After the new ship crews have successfully fought off the old ones, and Tarobei has finally been able to convince the association to renew the license (at the cost of his health), the ships can set sails.

Cast
 Michiyo Kogure as Mie Kamiya
 Yōko Katsuragi as Miwa Kamiya
 Teruko Kishi as Sami
 Chishū Ryū as Tarobei Kamiya
 Isuzu Yamada as Kaoru Uozumi
 Chieko Higashiyama as Mitsu
 Takashi Miki as Shōgo
 Keiko Tsushima as Yukiko Nomura
 Rentarō Mikuni as Tsuyoshi Yabuki
 Wataru Sakisaka as Wataru Yabuki
 Haruko Sugimura as Kono Kujirai
 Keiji Sada as Tamihiko Kujirai
 Kōji Mitsui as Moriyama
 Akira Ishihama as Ippei Nagisa
 Toshiko Kobayashi as Midori
 Takeshi Sakamoto as Jinkichi Aikawa
 Yasushi Nagata as Genroku Karasawa
 Seiji Miyaguchi as Gunzō Ishiguro

Awards
 Mainichi Film Concour for Best Actor Chishū Ryū

References

External links
 
 
 

1951 films
Japanese drama films
Japanese black-and-white films
Films directed by Keisuke Kinoshita
Films with screenplays by Keisuke Kinoshita
Shochiku films
1950s Japanese films